Echo & Boo, also known as The Adventures of Echo & Boo and Assorted Small Tails, is the fifth studio album by American progressive rock/AOR band Pavlov's Dog, released in 2010.

It's the first album with new material since Lost in America, and includes two original Pavlov's Dog members: their long-standing frontman David Surkamp and drummer Mike Safron.
The album is dedicated to the band's original violinist Siegfried Carver who died in 2009.

The album's cover depicts David Surkamp's father and uncle at a young age and the dog from Pavlov's Dog debut album Pampered Menial cover.

Track listing
All tracks credited to David Surkamp except where noted.

Personnel
All information according to the album's liner notes

Pavlov's Dog
David Surkamp: vocals, acoustic guitar, twelve-string guitar, electric guitar, piano, keyboards, bass, mandolin 
Mike Safron: drums, drum programming
Sara Surkamp: vocals, guitar, percussion
Nick Schlueter: piano, vocals
Abbie Hainz: violin, vocals
Rick Stieling: bass
Bill Franco: electric guitar

Guest Musicians
Phil Gomez: piano on tracks 1, 2, 3, 9
Jean Baue: soprano vocals on tracks 1, 2, 3, 4
Saylor Surkamp: backing vocals on tracks 2, 5, 6b
Nick Oliveri: backing vocals on Ava Gardner's Bust
John Wallach: bass on Ava Gardner's Bust
"Bongo" Billy Costello: drums, arp, chimes, percussion on tracks 1, 2, 3, 4, 8, 9, 10
Keith Moyer: flugelhorn on I Don't Do So Good Without You
Michael McElvain: piano on I Don't Need Magic Anymore

Production
David Surkamp: production
Sara Surkamp: recording engineering, audio mixing, mastering, production
Paul Hennerich: audio mixing, mastering
Mike Safron: additional production

Artwork
Sara Surkamp: cover art design and production

References

2010 albums
Pavlov's Dog (band) albums